Justin Gregory Boyle (born 13 April 1959) is a former New Zealand cricketer who played for Wellington and Canterbury in the 1980s. He was born in Christchurch. He is the rector of St Bede's College, Christchurch an all boys Catholic high school.

References

1959 births
Living people
New Zealand cricketers
Canterbury cricketers
Wellington cricketers